There are a number of optional parameters that may be present in an Internet Protocol version 4 datagram. They typically configure a number of behaviors such as for the method to be used during source routing, some control and probing facilities and a number of experimental features.

Loose source routing
Loose Source Routing is an IP option which can be used for address translation. LSR is also used to implement mobility in IP networks.  

Loose source routing uses a source routing option in IP to record the set of routers a packet must visit. The destination of the packet is replaced with the next router the packet must visit. By setting the forwarding agent (FA) to one of the routers that the packet must visit, LSR is equivalent to tunneling. If the corresponding node stores the LSR options and reverses it, it is equivalent to the functionality in mobile IPv6.

The name loose source routing comes from the fact that only part of the path is set in advance.

Strict source routing

Strict source routing is in contrast with loose source routing, in which every step of the route is decided in advance where the packet is sent.

Restrictions and considerations
The following two options are discouraged because they create security concerns: Loose Source and Record Route (LSRR) and Strict Source and Record Route (SSRR). Many routers block packets containing these options.

See also

Dynamic Source Routing
Source routing
Internet Protocol

References 

Routing
Internet architecture
Network protocols